June Ferestien (born June 19, 1963) is an American former professional tennis player.

A native of Newton, Massachusetts, Ferestien was a US Open junior semi-finalist and featured on the professional tour during the 1980s. Her WTA Tour performances included a win over Dianne Fromholtz at the Borden Classic in Tokyo in 1982. She also played a season of collegiate tennis for the University of Florida.

References

External links
 
 

1963 births
Living people
American female tennis players
Florida Gators women's tennis players
Tennis people from Massachusetts
Sportspeople from Newton, Massachusetts